Dolenja Vas is a roadside settlement in the Municipality of Prebold in east-central Slovenia. The area is part of the traditional region of Styria. The municipality is now included in the Savinja Statistical Region.

There are two small chapel-shrines in the settlement. One dates to 1725 and the other was built in the early 20th century.

References

External links
Dolenja Vas at Geopedia

Populated places in the Municipality of Prebold